Life as a Dog is the debut studio album by American hip hop recording artist K.Flay. The album was announced in April 2014 and was funded by fans through PledgeMusic. The album was released to consumers who crowd funded the album on June 10, 2014 and was released via digital distribution on June 24, 2014.

Reception

The San Francisco Chronicle said of the album "The new songs are colored with do-or-die inspiration, mixing her rapid-fire verses with sleek melodies and intricate electronic arrangements." Entertainment Weekly stated that the album "pairs spaced-out rap beats and chiming indie rock that K.Flay tops with her frequently tricky flows, making a chocolate-in-my-peanut-butter situation that should please rap-loving indie rockers, or the other way around"

"Can't Sleep" is featured in the 2021 film The Suicide Squad.

Track listing

Charts
The album reached No. 14 on the Billboard Rap Albums chart and No. 133 on the Billboard 200 for July 12, 2014.

References 

2014 debut albums
K.Flay albums